Belmonte is a municipality in the district of Castelo Branco, Portugal. The population in 2011 was 6,859, in an area of 118.76 km2.

History

Belmonte is the birthplace of Pedro Álvares Cabral, the navigator who discovered the land of Vera Cruz, now known as Brazil. Located in the Church of Santa Maria is the iconic statue of Nossa Senhora da Esperança (Our Lady of Hope), which Cabral took with him on his voyage. Until 1834, the statue was held by the Monastery of Nossa Senhora da Esperança. The former religious facility has been adapted for use as a modern boutique hotel.

The singer Zeca Afonso lived in Belmonte for part of his childhood, between 1938 and 1940. He lived with his uncle, the mayor of the town, whilst his parents, José Nepomuceno Afonso dos Santos, a magistrate, and Maria das Dores Dantas Cerqueira, a primary school teacher, were living and working in Mozambique.

Belmonte is home to the last remaining community of marranos in Portugal (known as the Belmonte Jews). They officially returned to Judaism in the 1970s and opened a synagogue in 1996.

In 2003, the American Sephardi Federation founded the Belmonte Project, designated to raise funds to acquire Judaic educational material and services for the community, which now numbers 160–180. They opened a Jewish Museum of Belmonte on 17 April 2005. In the summer of 2006, the American Sephardi Federation ceased to have the Belmonte Project under its auspices.

Geography
Administratively, the municipality is divided into 4 civil parishes (freguesias):
 Belmonte e Colmeal da Torre
 Caria
 Inguias
 Maçaínhas

Notable people 
 Pedro Álvares Cabral (ca.1467 – ca.1520) was a Portuguese nobleman, military commander, navigator and explorer.  In 1500 Cabral conducted the first substantial exploration of the northeast coast of South America and discovered Brazil.

References

External links

Town Hall official website
, Spring 2003
Photos from Belmonte
After 500 Years in Hiding, Jews Bring Prosperity to Iberian Town

Historic Jewish communities in Europe
Jewish Portuguese history
Populated places in Castelo Branco District
Municipalities of Castelo Branco District